Soratur also spelled as Soratooru is a village in the Gadag taluk of Gadag district in the Indian state of Karnataka. It is located in the Gadag taluk of Gadag district in Karnataka.

Demographics
 India census, Soratur had a population of 5349 with 2770 males and 2579 females.

See also
Naregal
Gajendragad
Ron
Gadag
Karnataka

External links
 http://Gadag.nic.in/

References

Villages in Gadag district